Scripps Ranch is a community of San Diego, California in the northeastern part of that city. Its ZIP code is 92131. It is located east of Interstate 15, north of Marine Corps Air Station Miramar, and south of Poway.

Scripps Ranch is a coastal/inland bedroom community within the City of San Diego. Miramar Reservoir is located within Scripps Ranch and offers recreational boating and fishing. A feature of Scripps Ranch is its landscaping, which includes many mature eucalyptus trees that are most apparent along Pomerado Road.

History
Scripps Ranch was originally a 400-acre (1.6 km) ranch owned by newspaper publisher E.W. Scripps.

In October 2003, a section of south Scripps Ranch was devastated by the Cedar Fire, destroying over 300 homes.

Two elected planning groups (the Scripps Ranch Planning Group and the Miramar Ranch North Planning Committee), advise the city on local planning and land-use issues.

Demographics
According to the San Diego County Assessor's Office's 2008 estimates, there were 32,476 people living in the neighborhood, an increase of 15.9% from 2000. The racial makeup of the neighborhood was 71% White, 15% Asian and Pacific Islander, 7.8% Hispanic, 3.7% from other races, 2.4% African American, and .01% American Indian.

The neighborhood is diverse in age, with 27% under 18 and 8% over 65. The median age was 39.5. There were an average of 2.78 persons per household. The median household income was $144,438; 9% of the 11,661 households made $200,000 or more, while 46% made $100,000 or more and 7% made $29,999 or less.

Education
The community is served by the San Diego City Schools.

Elementary schools
Dingeman Elementary School
E.B. Scripps Elementary School
Jerabek Elementary School
Miramar Ranch Elementary School

Middle schools
Thurgood Marshall Middle School

High schools
Scripps Ranch High School

Colleges and universities
Alliant International University
John Paul the Great Catholic University
National University

Media
 Scripps Ranch Civic Association Newsletter

Notable residents
 Adam Brody, actor, former resident
 Brandon Call, actor, former resident
 Jacques Cesaire, defensive end, San Diego Chargers
 Drew Brees, quarterback, New Orleans Saints, former resident
 Chris Chambers, wide receiver, San Diego Chargers, former resident
 Stephen Cooper, linebacker, San Diego Chargers
 Terry Crews, actor, former resident
 Ben Leber, linebacker, Minnesota Vikings
 Shawne Merriman, All-Pro linebacker, San Diego Chargers, former resident
 Mary Murphy, choreographer; dance judge on reality competition show So You Think You Can Dance
 Gary Plummer, former linebacker, San Diego Chargers
 Samuel H. Scripps, philanthropist in theatre and dance, former resident
 LaDainian Tomlinson, All-Pro running back, San Diego Chargers, former resident
 Jerry Trainor, actor, former resident
 Kellen Winslow, Hall of Fame former tight end, San Diego Chargers
 Kellen Winslow Jr., All-Pro tight end, Tampa Bay Buccaneers
 Kyle Mooney, actor, former resident
 Mike Scifres, former San Diego Chargers Punter
 Chad Ruhwedel, 2016/2017 Stanley Cup champion Pittsburgh Penguins defensemen, former resident

References

Urban communities in San Diego
Scripps family